Harrison Montgomery is a 2008 film directed by Daniel Dávila and starring Martin Landau. Landau's character plays the title role, a game show-obsessed recluse with magical powers and a large stash of money that Ricardo Papa, a small-time drug dealer with artistic pretensions, tries to steal.

Cast
 Martin Landau as Harrison Montgomery
 Melora Walters as Margo Fleming
 Brandon O'Neil Scott as Maurice 
 Manny Gavino as Jersey

References

External links

2008 films
2008 drama films
Films set in San Francisco
American drama films
2000s English-language films
2000s American films